Mattheus Adrianus "Matthé" Pronk (27 March 1947 – 25 March 2001) was a cyclist from the Netherlands who won the Amateur UCI Motor-paced World Championships in 1979 and 1981. He finished in second place in 1988, 1980, 1982 and 1983. He won the national titles in this event in 1977 and 1979. He was the father of three children including cyclists Jos Pronk (b. 1983) and Matthé Pronk (b. 1974). Besides cycling he worked as a carpenter.

References

1947 births
Dutch male cyclists
2001 deaths
People from Zijpe
Cyclists from North Holland